Carl Hallsthammar (June 13, 1894 – February 12, 1977) was an American sculptor. His work was part of the sculpture event in the art competition at the 1932 Summer Olympics.

References

1894 births
1977 deaths
20th-century American sculptors
20th-century American male artists
American male sculptors
Olympic competitors in art competitions
People from Hallstahammar Municipality